Leslie "Les" Lam is a Hong Kong-Canadian former Paralympian who won para table tennis medals, first at the 1972 Summer Paralympics representing Hong Kong and, four years later, at the 1976 Summer Paralympics representing Canada. He also competed in athletics, wheelchair basketball, and swimming in Paralympic Games from 1972 to 1984.

He began using a wheelchair following a spinal cord injury at age 8. He graduated from the University of Toronto and worked as a pharmacist in the Greater Toronto Area. In 1999 he was inducted into the Canadian Disability Hall of Fame.

References

Living people
Paralympic medalists in table tennis
Table tennis players at the 1972 Summer Paralympics
Table tennis players at the 1976 Summer Paralympics
Medalists at the 1972 Summer Paralympics
Medalists at the 1976 Summer Paralympics
Paralympic silver medalists for Hong Kong
Paralympic silver medalists for Canada
Paralympic bronze medalists for Canada
Paralympic table tennis players of Hong Kong
Paralympic table tennis players of Canada
People with paraplegia
Naturalised table tennis players
Hong Kong male table tennis players
Canadian male table tennis players
Hong Kong emigrants to Canada
University of Toronto alumni
Canadian sportspeople of Hong Kong descent
Year of birth missing (living people)
Canadian Disability Hall of Fame